Daula may refer to

 Daula (moth), a genus of moth
 Daula (month), the first month of the Mandaean calendar
 al-Dawla, an element in numerous honorific titles throughout the Islamic world
 Daula, a village in Bagpat district, Uttar Pradesh, India
 Daula, Sultanpur Lodhi, a village of Kapurthala district, Punjab State, India
 Daula, or davula, a double-headed cylindrical drum in Sri Lanka.